Reaves Henry Baysinger (February 22, 1902 – December 4, 1994) was the head football coach at Syracuse from 1947 to 1948. Despite his strong ties to the university he only produced a 4–14 (.222) record. On a higher note, in 1927, he coached the freshman basketball team to an undefeated 23–0 record.

Baysinger played college football as a guard and end at Syracuse. During his senior season, he was an honorable mention all-American. He also played basketball as a point guard, and baseball as an outfielder. Baysinger played one game in the NFL as a member of the Rochester Jeffersons in 1924. He died in 1994.

Head coaching record

References

1902 births
1994 deaths
American football ends
American football guards
Baseball outfielders
Point guards
Rochester Jeffersons players
Syracuse Orangemen baseball players
Syracuse Orange football coaches
Syracuse Orange football players
Syracuse Orange men's basketball players
People from Doylestown, Ohio
Players of American football from Akron, Ohio
Baseball players from Ohio
Basketball players from Akron, Ohio
American men's basketball players